WPVS-LD (channel 9) is a low-power television station in Milwaukee, Wisconsin, United States, which is affiliated with SportStak. The station is owned by SagamoreHill Broadcasting. It had been licensed to Sheboygan until 2011.

History

In Sheboygan
For seventeen years, the station acted as the local translator station for TBN, first transmitting from the downtown Firstar Building on channel 20 as W20AG in 1990. The station then moved to a new transmitting facility around 1999 on Sheboygan's south side along Weeden Creek Road (County Trunk Highway EE), in an industrial park just west of a WisDOT emissions testing station on land leased from Lakeshore Technical College (which formerly broadcast their college bulletin board on SCOLA affiliate W08BW (channel 8) from the site until the early 2000s). The next year, the station would move to channel 16 as W16BS, continuing to transmit the TBN schedule without local deviation.

Several factors influenced the sale of the station, including a declining audience via antenna for TBN's translator stations, and the signals of religious stations WTLJ (channel 54) and WLLA (channel 64) from Western Michigan being easily receivable during the summer months in the Sheboygan area.

The launch by TBN of WWRS (channel 52) from Mayville did not affect W16BS as that station's signal was blocked by the Kettle Moraine range east of Fond du Lac, blocking any signal from entering Sheboygan and leaving TBN to continue to operate W16BS. However, TBN and its other digital subchannels later launched on local cable provider Charter Communications in late August 2007, with reception via satellite. Time Warner Cable systems in the county also carried the network via WWRS via must-carry election. These carriage agreements, associated costs of the digital transition, and universal coverage by the major satellite broadcasters were likely the impetus for TBN's sale of the station to another party.

The station was taken silent after TBN sold the station to Sarasota, Florida-based Sheboygan Community Broadcasting, LLC in August 2007, which was likely a holding company designed solely to profit from a sale of the station's license without a commitment to broadcast (notably, the FCC application misspelled the city of license in the above LLC as "Sheboygen").

FCC records indicate that the station returned to the air on channel 29 as W29DJ on March 6, 2008, but from a different transmitter located south of Random Lake east of Highway 57, which had no Sheboygan coverage and served a small scattering of communities in southeast Sheboygan County and northeast Ozaukee County. Service from Random Lake was intermittent, as SCB's transmitter equipment was leased from another party and seized several times for non-payment before the sale to Polnet.

A return to Sheboygan became unlikely around July 2008, when the tower, transmitter, and TBN's satellite equipment was removed from the Weeden Creek Road site after LTC ended their lease with the city of Sheboygan for the land within the industrial park, leaving only the transmitter shed remaining for storage.

The station previously covered the eastern part of Sheboygan County, with the original footprint of the digital signal from Sheboygan expected to fully cover the county, southern Manitowoc County and northern Ozaukee County.

In Milwaukee
According to FCC records, Sheboygan Community Broadcasting sold the station on November 23, 2009, to Polnet Communications, which provides ethnic programming in Polish and other languages and owns several ethnic radio stations in the Chicago area, and formerly had a time-lease arrangement for Polish language television programming on WCIU-DT6 in Chicago before launching their own station in the area in 2010, WPVN-CA (Channel 24). Polnet planned to air "quality ethnic programming", according to their FCC statements, but never actually broadcast any programming as its entire twelve-year ownership period had them struggle to build out the station's permanent digital facilities.

A construction permit for channel 36 from the Milwaukee PBS Tower in Milwaukee was contested by Milwaukee PBS (then branded as MPTV) itself, which asserted their existing analog rights from WMVT being on analog channel 36 to place a digital translator station for WMVS there to address inefficiencies with WMVS's digital channel 8 signal in Milwaukee proper. Polnet subsequently withdrew the application for 36 and petitioned for a digital application on channel 30 in early December 2009, also from the Milwaukee PBS Tower. The placement of the station's transmitter in Milwaukee likely meant that Polnet did not intend to keep any kind of service to Sheboygan, and the placement of the analog tower in Random Lake was solely intended to "skip" the station down to Milwaukee, a move allowed under FCC regulations.

On April 9, 2010, the station was reclassified as a low power station, and took the lettered calls WPVS-LP. On January 3, 2011, the FCC authorized the change of city of license from Sheboygan to Milwaukee  with a license expiration of December 2013. The station's license was to expire on December 1, 2021; it has continued to operate under 'silent and licensed' authority from the FCC, with occasional operation from the rented Random Lake site to maintain the license while it looks to permanently operate from the Milwaukee PBS Tower.

On July 31, 2018, HC2 Holdings announced it would purchase WPVS-LP for $400,000, and in the interim a new construction permit for VHF channel 9 from the Milwaukee PBS tower has been filed (HC2 had filed a purchase agreement for WPVN in Chicago two months before). This would have had WPVS-LP become a sister station to WTSJ-LP (channel 38). However, the sale never closed and it remained owned by Polvision past the July 13, 2021 deadline to build permanent digital facilities, and again the station has continually been tolled while they are built out.

On November 3, 2021, it was announced that SagamoreHill Broadcasting would purchase WPVS-LP for $100,000 under the subsidiary Roseland Broadcasting. the sale was completed on June 29, 2022.

The station was licensed for digital operation on channel 9 effective January 14, 2022, which is also its virtual channel number. As of September 2022, the station broadcasts three subchannels, with the main channel carrying a network of unknown origin called SportStak. It also uses 9.2 instead as its main channel identification, presumably to avoid any confusion with Chicago's WGN-TV. Its station identification also erroneously identifies WXON-LD instead, a low-powered television station in Flint, Michigan which is also on channel 9, but is not owned by SagamoreHill itself. Its other two subchannels are affiliated with OnTV4U and Jewelry Television.

References

PVS-LD
Television channels and stations established in 1990
1990 establishments in Wisconsin
Low-power television stations in the United States
SagamoreHill Broadcasting